Beaver Falls Grange Hall No. 554 is a historic Grange hall located at Beaver Falls in Lewis County, New York.  It was built in 1892, and is a two-story, wood-frame building measuring 30 feet wide and 60 feet deep.  It sits on a fieldstone foundation and has a front gable roof. It features a one-story, hipped roof front porch. The first floor was converted to a store in 1915.

It was listed on the National Register of Historic Places in 2015.

References

Grange organizations and buildings in New York (state)
Grange buildings on the National Register of Historic Places in New York (state)
Buildings and structures completed in 1892
Buildings and structures in Lewis County, New York
National Register of Historic Places in Lewis County, New York
1892 establishments in New York (state)